La Vallée is a former district of the canton of Vaud, Switzerland, consisting of three municipalities in the Vallée de Joux. The seat of the district was the village of Le Sentier. La Vallée has been merged into Jura-North Vaudois District.

The following municipalities are located within the district:
L'Abbaye
Le Chenit
Le Lieu

The following villages are in the district:
Le Brassus
Le Sentier
Le Solliat
Derrière-la-Côte
L'Orient
L'Abbaye
Les Bioux
Le Pont
Le Lieu
Les Charbonnières
Le Sechey

References

External links
http://www.valleedejoux.ch

Former districts of the canton of Vaud